The Military Office of the President of the Czech Republic, MOPR (Czech: Vojenská kancelář prezidenta republiky, VKPR) is the official military department of the President of the Czech Republic. It serves as a separate entity from the Army of the Czech Republic and the Prague Castle Guard, although it controls most of the activities of the Castle Guard. It mostly fulfils tasks by order of the President of the Czech Republic, in accordance with Section 26 of Act No. 219, which describes the president in his/her authority as commander in chief being the superior to the Chief of Staff of the Military Office (currently Lieutenant general František Hrabal). It also organizes military protocol during state visits of foreign leaders to Prague and approves other senior military appointments in the armed forces. It was founded in on New Year's Day in 1919 by order of President Tomáš Garrigue Masaryk. Its functions were interrupted at the onset of the Second World War, when Nazi Germany invaded and occupied Prague. After 1940, its functions were carried out in London while serving the government in exile. It was disbanded in 1948 when communists came to power in the country. Its functions were restored in 1990 following the fall of communism and the dissolution of Czechoslovakia.

See also
 President of the Czech Republic
 Armed Forces of the Czech Republic
 Prague Castle Guard

References

External Sources
 Prague Castle
 Uniforms of the MOPR

Military of the Czech Republic
1919 establishments in Czechoslovakia
1990 establishments in Czechoslovakia